Nilesat 201, is an Egyptian communications satellite, which was launched on 4 August 2010.

Nilesat 201 will enable the Egyptian satellite operator Nilesat to deliver digital Direct to Home (DTH) TV and radio broadcasting and high-speed data transmission services to North Africa and the Middle East starting in September 2010. It was built by Thales Alenia Space in the Cannes Mandelieu Space Center, and is based on the Spacebus 4000B2 satellite bus. It will be operated in geosynchronous orbit, at a longitude of 7° West. The spacecraft has a design life of 15 years and a mass at launch of 3.2 tonnes. It is powered by solar arrays which will generate 5.9 kilowatts of electricity at the end of the spacecraft's design life. It will carry 40 transponders, of which 24 will be Ku band for broadcasting, and 4 will be Ka band. Nilesat 201 was launched by an Ariane 5ECA rocket at 20:59 UTC on 4 August 2010.

References

External links

 Arianespace: Nilesat 201 - RASCOM launch kit
Nilesat 201 at International Media Switzerland

Telecommunications in Egypt
Communications satellites in geostationary orbit
Spacecraft launched in 2010
Satellites of Egypt
2010 in Egypt
Ariane commercial payloads
Satellites using the Spacebus bus